Kulansarak (Kulansa rak; also as Kulansarike) is a township of Akqi County in Xinjiang Uygur Autonomous Region, China. Located in the northeast of the county, it covers an area of 1,594 kilometres with a population of 4,498 (2010 Census), the main ethnic group is Kyrgyz. The township has 5 administrative villages (as of 2018) and 9 unincorporated villages under jurisdiction, its seat is at Jildiz Village.

Name
The name of Kulansa rak is from the Kyrgyz language, meaning  yellow grass beach with wild horses. It is said that the township was so named because there were wild horses that lived here. The township is located in the northeast of the county, 33 kilometers northeast of the county seat Akqi Town.

History
It was formerly part of the 1st district in 1950, Hulangshan Commune was established in 1958. Kulansarak Commune was created in 1962. It was renamed to Xiangyang Commune in 1969 during the Cultural Revolution.  In 1978, the commune was renamed Kulansarak Commune. It was organized as a township in 1984.

Administrative divisions
Kulansarak includes 5 villages:
 Bedel Village (بەدەل كەنت / Biedieli)
 Jildiz Village (Jiledesi, Jiledesicun) 
 Aktekir Village (Aketeketi'er, Akete Keti'ercun) 
 Yushanguxi Village
 Ayinikekake'er Village

Economy
The main industries in the township are planting and animal husbandry, wheat, corn, broad beans, hemp and rape are the main products. It is one of the main grain and edible oil producing areas in the county. There are roads link to the provincial road S306.

Demographics

, 99.29% of the population of Kulansarak was Kyrgyz.

Transportation
 Road to the Bedel Pass on the China–Kyrgyzstan border passes through the township

References 

Township-level divisions of Akqi County